Trevor Clarke MLA (born 28 July 1967) is a Unionist politician from Northern Ireland representing the Democratic Unionist Party (DUP).

Political career 
Clarke was first elected in 2007 to the Northern Ireland Assembly as a Democratic Unionist Party (DUP) member for South Antrim. Clarke lost his seat at the 2017 Assembly election, but was later co-opted by the DUP after Paul Girvan was elected in the 2017 general election to represent South Antrim in the House of Commons.

Controversies 
Speaking in the Assembly in November 2016, he confessed to not knowing that heterosexual individuals could contract HIV, which was criticised by Elton John. 

In 2020, Clarke apologised for liking a social media post suggesting that the COVID-19 pandemic was "God's punishment" for the legalization of same-sex marriage and abortion. 

In 2021, Clarke defended meeting with loyalist paramilitaries, stating that "examples like that" showed "leadership".

Personal life 
Clarke is active in the Orange Order. His wife Linda is a DUP councillor.

References

Links
 Profile, dup.org.uk; accessed 15 May 2016.

Living people
Democratic Unionist Party MLAs
Northern Ireland MLAs 2007–2011
Northern Ireland MLAs 2011–2016
Northern Ireland MLAs 2016–2017
Councillors in Northern Ireland
Presbyterians from Northern Ireland
1967 births
Place of birth missing (living people)
Northern Ireland MLAs 2017–2022
Northern Ireland MLAs 2022–2027